Sumati Kshetramade (Devanagari: सुमती क्षेत्रमाडे) (7 March 1913 – 1997) was an India Marathi writer  from Maharashtra.

A major theme of her novels is the exploitation of women.

Kshetramade was a physician by profession.

Her novels include:

 Shrāvaṇadhārā (1983)
 Pratipadā (1982)
 Makhamalī Baṭavā (1979)
 Āshāḍh Megh (1976)
 Sharvari Sharvari
 Yugandharā
 Ābhās
 Mahāshwetā
 Anuhār
 Wrundā
 Yādnyaseni
Sāmbarāchi Shinge
 Jiwan-Swapna

References

Indian women novelists
Marathi people
Marathi-language writers
1913 births
1997 deaths
Novelists from Maharashtra
20th-century Indian novelists
Women writers from Maharashtra
20th-century Indian women writers